This is a list of rail accidents from 1960 to 1969.

1960 
 January 7 – Italy – At Monza, an express from Sondrio to Milan fails to slow as it approaches a construction zone with a  speed limit on the temporary track.  It derails on the sharp curve.  One source says 30 people are killed and 70 injured; another says 17 killed and 120 injured.
 January 10 – United States – The New York Central Railroad's Southwest Limited  from St. Louis to Cleveland, instead of slowing to pick up a train order at Wellington, Ohio, approaches too fast in the fog and derails. The signal tower is demolished, but the signalman is safely on the ground preparing to hand over the train order. An early report indicates 6 people were killed and at least 40 injured.
 January 11 – United States – 9 people were injured in total after a Santa Fe Chief slammed into a stalled truck near Sanford, Texas.
 January 21 – United Kingdom – Settle rail crash: On an express passenger train from Glasgow to London, the driver heard a knocking sound on his BR Standard Class 7 steam locomotive and stopped, but could not identify the problem in a snowstorm at night. He decided to proceed cautiously to the next motive power depot, but before getting there, the engine's motion came apart and struck the tracks. The track damage derailed a freight train passing in the opposite direction; the derailed cars collided with the passenger train, killing five people and injuring nine.
 January 28 – United Kingdom – An electric multiple unit overruns signals at Borough Market Junction, London and is in a sidelong collision with a diesel-electric multiple unit. Another electric multiple unit collides with the derailed train. Seven people are injured.
The passenger train's engineer is killed and 33 passengers and 4 railwaymen are injured.
 March 1 – United States – Bakersfield, California – The Chicago-bound San Francisco Chief collided with a fuel truck on Allen Road, just north of Rosedale Highway, killing 14: ten passengers, three crew members, and the driver of the truck.
 April 1 – United Kingdom – An electric multiple unit is in collision with a light engine between Loughborough Junction and  due to a signalman's error. One person is killed and twelve are injured.
 May 15 – East Germany – Leipzig: Two local trains, collide in Leipzig central station owing to a default in the electricity supply to the station which also affected the signalling and a following dispatcher error. 54 people die, 200 are injured.
 June 3 – United Kingdom – An electric multiple unit train overruns signals at Waterloo and is in sidelong collision with a passenger train.
 July 8 – India – In the North Eastern Railway zone, a train crosses the Yamuna River bridge at Mathura with people riding on the roof, and 25 of them are knocked off by the bridge superstructure and killed.
 July 12 – Argentina – Comodoro Rivadavia rail disaster (1960) – In Comodoro Rivadavia a passenger train suffered a brake failure, it lost control and crashed another train at high speed. As a result, 3 people died and many other were severely injured.
 July 28 – Cuba – Near Camagüey, a civilian train carrying militia from Oriente province to Havana, reportedly suffering a brake failure, collides with the train ahead, a military passenger train also from Oriente province to Havana. Several people are killed and an early report indicates that there may be many more deaths; 80 are injured.
 November 16 – Czechoslovakia – Stéblová train disaster: 118 people are killed and 110 injured in a head-on collision.
 November 21 – Netherlands – Woerden train disaster: A British train derails at Woerden, killing two.
 November 29 – Canada – Lamont, Alberta: CN train collides with a school bus at a level crossing on the edge of town, killing 17 students.

1961 
Also on board is the Barcelona Espanyol soccer team, but the team suffers no injuries.
 January 31 – United States – When 18 cars of a Kansas City Southern freight train derail near New Roads, Louisiana, a tank car of chlorine ruptures. About 1,000 people are evacuated from homes and schools. Of 50 taken to hospital, one baby boy dies and six members of his family, as well as four others, are reported in critical condition. Many farm animals are also killed.
 February 11 – United Kingdom – An express freight train is derailed near Rugby, Warwickshire. The wagons foul the adjacent line, and are run into by an express passenger train. Driver A.L.L. Jones was killed, trapped on the footplate and two passengers were injured.
Three people are killed.
The train then catches fire. The driver was seriously injured.
 March 11 – Taiwan – 27 killed, 15 injured when a southbound passenger train (#3001 Diesel Limited Express) smashed into a truck carrying soldiers at a level crossing between Linfengyin (林鳳營) and Longtien (隆田), Tainan
Twelve people are injured.
 March 30 – Italy – A 7-car Rapido express train from Turin to Rome is destroyed by fire in a tunnel near Sestri Levante. Of 450 passengers on board, at least 5 are killed and more than 70 injured.
 April 11 – United Kingdom – An electric multiple unit overruns signals and crashes into another at Waterloo station. One person is killed and fourteen are injured.
 April 18 – United Kingdom – During single-line working, a passenger train is derailed between Laindon and Pitsea, Essex when a linesman clips trap points in the open position.
 April 19 – India – Sabotaged track derails a passenger train at Siliguri, killing 23 people and injuring 77, 28 seriously.
 May 22 – United States – Arlington, Oregon: A Union Pacific freight train derails, killing two people, sending twenty rail cars off the track, and catching on fire.
 June 13 – West Germany – On a section of temporary single-track working at Esslingen am Neckar, one local train runs past signals and collides head-on with another on an embankment and 35 people are killed.
 July 8 – Taiwan – 48 were killed, 28 injured when a southbound passenger train (#11 Limited Express) smashed into a bus at a level crossing in Minxong, Chiayi County.
Seven were killed (the driver and six passengers) and 116 were injured.
 October 5 – West Germany – In Hamburg, between the Hauptbahnhof and nearby Berliner Tor station, an S-Bahn train runs past signals and crashes into a work train loaded with  girders, some of which crash into the passenger cars; 28 people are killed and 55 injured.
 October 26 – Japan – On the Ōita Kōtsu company's line from Ōita to Beppu, a massive landslide derails and buries a tramcar carrying 66 passengers; 32 people are killed and everyone else on board is injured.
 October 29 – India – A derailment due to excessive speed, between Mainpuri and Bhongaon, kills 22 people and injures 62.
 December 14 – United States – Auburn, Colorado: The Union Pacific passenger train "City of Denver" en route to Denver collides with a school bus carrying 36 children bound for Delta and Arlington elementary schools, Meeker Junior High, and Greeley High. 20 of the children were killed, 16 children and the driver survived.
 December 23 – Italy – Fiumarella rail disaster: a Cosenza–Catanzaro train derails on a bridge near Catanzaro. 70 people die and 27 are injured.
 December 26 – United States – A 64-year-old man died and 38 people sustained non-life-threatening injuries when four cars of a train derailed while rounding the curve just north of York–Dauphin station, Philadelphia.

1962 
 January 8 – Netherlands – The Harmelen train disaster, the deadliest railway accident in the history of The Netherlands, occurs when Utrecht–Rotterdam express train driver misses a warning signal in fog and passes a red signal to collide nearly head-on with another passenger train from Rotterdam to Amsterdam. 91 people (including both drivers) die, 54 are injured of whom 2 lost their lives while in hospital.
 February 2 – United Kingdom – A passenger train is in a rear-end collision with a freight train at Polmont, Stirlingshire due to a signalman's error. Five people are injured.
 February 22 – Colombia – A passenger train from Buenaventura to Cali  collides head-on on a single track, near its destination, with a freight train; 40 people are killed, all in the first 4 cars of the passenger train, and 67 injured.
 March 3 – Italy – Castel Bolognese train disaster. The Bari–Milan train derails while entering the station of Castel Bolognese, Ravenna, killing 13 and injuring 80.

 April 17 – Thailand – At Padang Besar, seven people were killed in a collision of two passenger trains.
 May 3 – Japan – Mikawashima train crash: A freight train passes a danger signal; it is diverted safely into a siding at Mikawashima Station in Tokyo, but derails at the end of it, fouling the adjacent track. A 6-car commuter train bound for Toride then crashes into the wreckage, and another train bound for Ueno crashes into the new wreckage as well as passengers trying to evacuate from the previous crash. Altogether 160 people are killed and 296 injured.
 May 10 – USSR – Two crowded commuter trains collided while one of them was stopped at a junction in the north part of Moscow. Foreign newspapermen and diplomats living nearby reported seeing scores of ambulances, but as usual the Soviet authorities tried to hush up the news. The accident occurred on National Railway Day.
 May 18 – United States – The Laurentian, a Delaware and Hudson passenger train traveling from Montreal to Albany derails next to Waterford Rural Cemetery. 1 crewmember suffers fatal wounds and dies in the hospital, and 7 passengers are injured.
 May 31 – Italy – Voghera train crash; a freight train collides with a passenger train at Voghera railway station, Lombardy, killing 63 and injuring 40.
 June 3 – United Kingdom – Lincoln rail crash: The Night Scotsman express passenger train is derailed at Lincoln due to excessive speed on a curve. Nine people are killed and 49 injured.
 June 8 – India – At Bhilai, 11 coaches of a passenger train are blown over by wind during a cyclonic storm, killing 9 people and injuring 123.
 June 11 – Argentina – Villa Soldati level crossing tragedy: 42 people are killed and 88 are injured, when a bus is hit by an express train in Villa Soldati in southwest Buenos Aires.
 July 21 – India – A mail train from Amritsar to Howrah collides at Buxar with a freight train being shunted on the main line; reportedly, the signal operators promptly flee the scene. At least 48 people are killed and 55 seriously injured.
 July 22 – Romania – A passenger train derails between Bucharest and Mogoșoaia due to excess speed, and 32 people are killed.
 July 23 – France – Velars-sur-Ouche, Bourgogne: A Paris–Marseille express train derailed, killing at least 39 people and injuring another 49.
 July 28 – United States – A 9-car Pennsylvania Railroad train from Harrisburg to Philadelphia, carrying baseball fans to a Philadelphia-Pittsburgh game, derailed at Steelton. Three cars were in use—the rest were reserved for passengers boarding later—and those three cars fell into the Susquehanna River valley, one landing in the river. The crash killed 19 people and injured 119. A railroad spokesman said the track was apparently out of alignment.
Thirty-eight people are injured.
 August 25 – United Kingdom – A passenger train comes to a halt near Totnes, Devon due to a fault in the diesel locomotive hauling it. Another passenger train runs into its rear due to driver error. Twenty-three people are injured.
Four of the five carriages forming the train are destroyed. 
 October 5 – France – Part of a freight train going to Dijon derails near Montbard. The following train, the Aquilon, is safely stopped by signals, but the other track is fouled and a 3-car Cisalpin train from Milan to Paris crashes into the wreckage, killing 9 people.
 October 9 – Poland – Moszczenica (near Piotrków Trybunalski): Warsaw–Budapest express slams into derailed cars of regional Gliwice–Warsaw express. Official death toll is 34 people killed and 67 injured, but the real toll is probably far higher.
 October 16 – United Kingdom – A London Transport electric multiple unit runs into the rear of another near , Hertfordshire. Eleven people are injured.
 November 5 – Yugoslavia – A derailment, possibly at Kumanovo (now in North Macedonia),  kills at least 23 people and injures 17.
 November 30 – Canada – A Canadian Pacific Railway tank car develops a crack and 30 tons (27 t) of chlorine leaks out while it sits on a siding in the city of Cornwall, Ontario. No one dies, but more than 100 people require hospital treatment.
 December 26 – United Kingdom – Coppenhall Junction railway accident: Because the lineside telephones were out of order, the driver of a Glasgow-to-London train could not speak to the signalman, but he could see the next signal ahead, so he decided to advance cautiously. Only at the last moment did he see a train in front of him. The resulting collision killed 18 people.

1963 
 January 4 – India – In the North Eastern Railway zone, two trains collide at Umeshnagar, near Monghyr (now Munger). One source indicates 37 are killed and 86 injured; another, 42 killed and over 100 injured.
 March 18 – Brazil – After a Rio de Janeiro commuter train stalls, passengers unload onto the tracks and are struck by an express train on another track; at least 12 of them are killed.
 April 1 – United Kingdom – A freight train is derailed near Weedon, Northamptonshire due to a defective wagon and fouls the adjacent line. An express passenger train collides with the derailed wagons.
 April 9 – India – Shots fired at a train on the Northeast Frontier Railway, reportedly by Naga tribesmen, kill six people.
 April 11 – Indonesia – An express from Jakarta to Bandung derails near its destination. One heavily loaded car falls into a ravine, rolling over several times; altogether 37 people are killed.
 April 28 – United States – A freight train derails near Dillsburg, Pennsylvania, leaking chlorine gas. Eventually a propane explosion rocks the neighborhood and the mushroom cloud can be seen for miles.
 May 27 – United Kingdom – A Romney, Hythe and Dymchurch Railway train from Hythe to New Romney, hauled by Hercules suffers a fault in its brake system. The driver manages to get the train running, but at only . The train is run into by the following train, hauled by Typhoon, derailing a number of carriages and causing a number of injuries.
 May 28 – Portugal – While one train was loading and another was unloading at Cais do Sodré station in Lisbon, the roof over the platforms collapsed. It was only three years old. About 50 people were killed and many more injured.
 August 1 – United Kingdom – An express passenger train overruns signals and collides with a passenger train at Norton Junction, Staffordshire.
 August 1 – United Kingdom – A passenger train formed of electric multiple units is derailed at  station, West Sussex because an electrical fault causes a point motor to operate a set of points as the train approaches them. Thirty-eight people are injured.
At least 30 people are killed and 100 injured.
 August 9 – United States – While a Pennsylvania Railroad tank car holding  of chlorine is being unloaded at a chemical plant in Philadelphia, the line breaks and the gas is released. No one dies, but 275 people require hospital treatment.
 August 15 – United Kingdom – Knowle and Dorridge rail crash: An express passenger train is in collision with a freight train at  station, Warwickshire due to a signalman's error. Three people are killed.
 September 17 – United States – Chualar bus crash – A freight train collides with a bus carrying 58 migrant farmworkers at a railroad crossing outside Chualar, California, killing 32 people and injuring 25. The crash ranks as the deadliest automobile accident in the United States to date, according to the National Safety Council.
 November 9 – Japan – Tsurumi rail accident: a twelve car -Tokyo commuter train collides with three cars of a freight train which had derailed, and hits head on the Tokyo- commuter train during slow speed, and crushing four passenger cars at –, Yokosuka and Tokaido Line, Yokohama, killing at least 161 people, another 120 are injured.
 December 5 – Ireland – Mullingar, County Westmeath: A broken down passenger train is run into by the locomotive sent to rescue it. 16 people are injured.
 December 24 – Hungary – A collision near Szolnok kills 45 people; one of the drivers is held responsible and sentenced to 11 years in prison.

1964 
 February 1 – Argentina – Altamirano rail disaster – near Buenos Aires: A Mar del Plata-Buenos Aires Firefly Express with 1,040 passengers on board collided head-on with a freight train, killing 34 people.
 February 15 – Brazil – Two wooden cars of a train from Petrópolis to Rio de Janeiro derailed and fell into a ravine, killing at least 3 people and injuring 20.
Three people are killed, 27 are hospitalised.
 June 19 – South Vietnam – Viet Cong guerillas blow up four cars of a train  past Nha Trang en route to Saigon (now Ho Chi Minh City), killing 20 passengers and injuring 40.
 July 26 – Portugal – Because most passengers did not want to wait for the second one, the first of two Automara trains from Póvoa de Varzim to Oporto is severely overcrowded. Approaching Oporto, the train is speeding around a curve at Custóias at about  when the rear car breaks free, derails, and smashes into an overbridge in the Portugal's worst ever train accident. Early reports indicate 69 killed and 92 injured, all from the one car, but in the end 94 people die.
 July 29 – South Africa – A derailment near Randfontein kills at least 21 people.
Eleven wagons are derailed and catch fire. The locomotive is extensively damaged by fire and declared a write-off. It is scrapped in November 1964.
 August 21 – Canada – At a level crossing in Leonard, Ontario (about 32 km/20 miles east of Ottawa), a truck loaded with gravel smashes into a Canadian Pacific Railway train from Ottawa to Montreal, derailing the last 3 cars of the 7-car train. The truck driver and 7 train passengers are killed; at least another 20 are injured.
 September 6 – Sweden – An express train from Stockholm derails near Ånge, killing 8 people and injuring 35.
 October 5 – United Kingdom – Two passenger trains collided in dense fog near  when the wrong signal was given. The trains were the 08:20 Kings Cross – Doncaster and 09:00 Kings Cross – Newcastle. The only injury was to the driver, who had to be cut from the train.
 October 20 – California- A Southern Pacific switch engine hits 10-year-old boy, Barry Waszcyszak, of Chapman Ave at 5:05pm.  Boy loses arm, fractured leg and head injuries.
Another source indicates 42 killed and at 75 critically injured.
 December 20 – Italy – Just outside the station for Pompeii, a stopped southbound passenger train is rear-ended by another train, killing 3 passengers and injuring nearly 100 more.
 December 22–23 – India – At about midnight, during the 1964 Rameswaram cyclone, train 653 from Pamban is approaching its terminus, the Palk Strait port of Dhanushkodi, when the signals fail. The driver decides to proceed, but then the storm surge crashes onto the land, overwhelming the train and destroying the town. The number killed on the train is variously estimated as 115, or 128, or anywhere up to 200.
 December 23 – India – During the 1964 Rameswaram cyclone, an express from Trivandrum (now Thiruvananthapuram) to Madras (now Chennai) was derailed by a washout between Vadipatti and Kodaikanal, with four deaths and seven serious injuries.

1965 
 February 10 – Spain – A night train from Madrid to Barcelona suffers a fast-spreading fire shortly after leaving Grisén at 6:15 a.m., destroying several wooden-bodied cars. Some passengers jump from the train before it stops. Thirty people are killed.
All four tracks of the Brighton Main Line are blocked.
 March 14 – United States – A Sunday morning passenger train and crude oil tanker truck collision killed two Mineola (Texas) railroad men. Fatally burned were engineer M.J. Shadow  and fireman, Robert L. Cannon. Both were in the cab of the westbound T & P passenger train when it struck the trailer of the crude oil tanker. 
 March 28 – Brazil – A passenger train crashes into derailed cars of a freight train at Commendador,  killing 21 and injuring 40.
 April 5 – Brazil – A passenger train and freight train collide head-on at Três Rios. An early report indicates an estimate of 40 deaths.
 April 17 – Canada – At Terrace Bay, Ontario, the Canadian Pacific Railway's eastbound Canadian en route from Vancouver to Toronto and Montreal is derailed by subsidence and some of the cars go down an embankment. One baggage car employee is killed, as well as one apparent stowaway, but most passenger injuries are minor.
 June 30 – Spain – At a level crossing in El Arahal (now Arahal), a medium-distance train crashes into a bus going from Seville to El Saucejo; 13 people are killed and 35 injured.
 August 16 – Spain – A mail train to Madrid and a freight train collide head-on near Gádor, killing 11 people and injuring 65.
Three people are killed and eight are injured.
 October 4 – South Africa – An overcrowded passenger train carrying black workers to KwaMashu derails at Effingham Junction near Durban; 81, 89 or 150 people are killed and hundreds injured.  A white signalman is killed in retaliation by an angry crowd of black people. This is the worst rail disaster in South African history.
 December 8 – Burma – A Yangon–Mandalay nightly express train ploughed into a standing passenger train, killing 80 people and injuring 100 in Toungoo, Bago Division.
 December 18 – Spain – Express train from Irún to Lisbon collided with a local passenger train near Villar de los Álamos, Salamanca, killing 34 people. 50 more people were injured.
 December 20 – Portugal – A commuter train serving Lisbon crashed into a freight train at Algueirão. An early report indicated that 22 people were confirmed dead and 12 badly injured, but the overturned cars had not yet been searched and a total of over 40 dead was estimated.

1966 
 January 2 – United States – The last two cars of the Louisville and Nashville Railroad's South Wind derail near Franklin, Kentucky, injuring 19 of an estimated 400 passengers on board. The last car, a private coach owned by Robert T. Hogan of Oak Park, Illinois, turns over on its side, injuring him and several members of his family, while passengers in the next coach, which derails but stays upright, were injured by baggage stored overhead striking them in the head and back.
 January 7 – United States – D&H freight train derailed at the NY Route 206 grade crossing in Bainbridge, New York, killing 2 people.
 January 20 – Portugal – A train was swept off the tracks by a landslide near Agueda, killing at least 5 people and injuring more than 20.
 February 3 – United Kingdom – On the underground railway in a coal mine at Rotherham, a locomotive crashed into a train carrying miners, killing at least 6 and injuring 21.
 February 9 – United Kingdom – Two coaches of a London-bound commuter train burst into flame as the train moved at around 65 miles an hour (105 km/h), with scores of passengers jumping from the blazing cars, which was finally stopped near Radlett, 20 miles (32 km) north of London. Thirty-three persons, many of them stretcher cases with burns, were taken to hospitals. Others were treated beside the tracks where the train halted after passengers pulled the emergency cord. Rescue officials praised the quick action of John Allam, chief test pilot for the nearby Handley-Page Aircraft plant, in sounding an alarm that brought firemen and ambulances to the scene within minutes. He also notified a signalman up the line to halt following trains. The fire was caused by a broken drive shaft puncturing a fuel tank. The shaft probably broke due to the presence of instrumentation as part of a trial.
 April 20 – India – A train from Tinsukia to New Jalpaiguri is standing at Lumding Junction when a bomb explosion destroys several cars and kills 57 people; another 72 are injured. Naga rebels are suspected to be responsible.
 April 23 – India – Another train from Tinsukia to New Jalpaiguri is standing at Diphu when a bomb explosion kills 41 people and injures another 81. Again, Naga rebels are suspected to be responsible.
 May 2 – India – A car carrying munitions explodes at a Central Railway marshalling yard at Bhusaval station; 7 people are killed and 31 injured.
 May 31 – Romania – Soon after starting from Bucharest, an express to Galați collides with a local train; 38 people are killed, 65 are injured, and the country's minister of railways is fired.
 June 13 – India – Two suburban commuter EMU trains collide head-on in torrential monsoon rain between Matunga and Sion railway stations, Bombay, killing 57 and injuring 106, 42 seriously. The driving cab and the first few coaches of each trains are crushed. Coaches telescope into each other and climb over the adjacent coaches. It is thought the heavy monsoon rains might have disrupted the signalling system.
 June 19 – India – An express passenger train from Ahmedabad to New Delhi crashes into a stationary freight train near Ajmer; 15 people are killed and 38 seriously injured.
 July 13 – United States – Cherryville, North Carolina, Seaboard Air Line trains #45 and #46 hit head-on on the east side of the city killing J.W. Pait and destroying 6 locomotives and derailing 22 cars. GP-9's 1911-1927-1963-1971-1979 and F-3,4027 were units destroyed. The trucks of the units were salvaged and sent to General Electric and used on new SAL U-30-B units 800–814 delivered in late 1966 and early 1967, and two exist today on the Georgia Central Railroad.
 July 15 – United Kingdom – Kingham, Oxfordshire. An express passenger train derails due to the movement of a switch blade on a set of points. The switch blade was able to move because bolts had been removed and the blade had not been clamped. Seventeen people are injured.
 July 21 – Pakistan – A train crashes into a bus on a level crossing in Lodhran; 38 people are believed dead.
 July 27 – United Kingdom – A freight train is derailed near , Kent. The line is blocked for two days.
 August 1 – South Africa – A train wreck at Johannesburg causes six deaths and 297 injuries. Violence follows, with Africans attacking the white train crew and being fired on by police.
 August 14 – United Kingdom – A passenger train is derailed when it runs into a landslip at Ardoch, Dumfriesshire.
 September 13 – Canada – In Corner Brook, Newfoundland, a freight train crashes into a switching engine. Three railwaymen in one of the locomotive cabs are killed.
 October 7 – Canada – The Dorion level crossing accident: In Dorion, Quebec, a chartered school bus carrying teenage students to a dance stops at a level crossing while a Canadian National Railway passenger train goes through, but then one or more youths deliberately raise the barrier arm although a freight train is approaching in the other direction. The bus driver starts onto the crossing and the resulting collision kills him and 19 students.
 November 2 – Netherlands – A diesel multiple unit derails at the railway accident near Halfweg (1966) in North Holland.
 November 16 – Brazil – At Nilópolis, a suburban passenger train runs past signals and collides with another one, killing 38 people.
 November 17 – West Germany – On the line from Frankfurt to Königstein, a diesel railcar left unattended at Kelkheim-Hornau station runs away eastward at speeds reaching 100 km/h.  An attempt to derail it at Kelkheim-Münster station fails and it crashes into a westbound passenger train near Liederbach, killing 7 people and injuring 80. 
The derailed wagons collide with a footbridge over the line, blocking it for two days.
 December 18 – Spain – An empty freight train running 8 hours late runs past signals as well as an emergency hand-signal at Villafranca del Campo and enters the single track toward Santa Eulalia del Campo.  It collides head-on with a train of diesel railcars going from Teruel to Zaragoza,  where most of the passengers are riding in the lead car because its heating is better; 29 people are killed.
 December 28 – United States – 1966 Everett, Massachusetts train crash: Just after midnight, a tanker truck full of heating oil stalls on a level crossing at Everett, Massachusetts, when the brakes stick on. A Boston and Maine Railroad train from Boston to Rockport, consisting of a single Budd RDC car, crashes into it and is engulfed in flame, killing 12 people out of about 25 on board.

1967 
 January 12 – Botswana – A Rhodesian Railways passenger train derails between Malapiye Road and Palapiye, killing one man and seriously injuring three people.
Nine people are killed and sixteen are injured.
 March 5 – United Kingdom – Connington South rail crash: An express passenger train is derailed at Conington, Huntingdonshire because a signalman moves a set of points under the train. Five people are killed and eighteen are injured. The signalman is subsequently convicted of endangering persons being conveyed on the railway but found not guilty on a manslaughter charge. He is sentenced to two years' imprisonment.
 May 22 – United States – 1967 New York City freight train collision: Two freight trains collide in Manhattan, killing six.

 July 6 – East Germany – Langenweddingen level crossing disaster, Langenweddingen near Magdeburg: Because of an overstretched cable preventing the proper operation of a level crossing's barriers, a local train collides with a lorry carrying 15,000 litres of light petrol and ignites. 94 people are killed, of whom 44 are children on a holiday outing. After the accident, barrier-dependent train signalling was introduced on the DR network.
 July 31 – United Kingdom – Thirsk rail crash, an express train from King's Cross to Edinburgh collides at speed with the wreckage of a derailed freight train. Seven are killed and 45 injured, 15 seriously.
 August 2 - Canada - At Dunrankin, Ontario, on the Canadian National Railways, an 84-car freight train emerging from a siding collides head-on with the westbound Super Continental. There are no serious injuries to passengers, but all four engine crewmen are killed.
 September 17 - United States - On the Mount Washington Cog Railway in New Hampshire, a wrongly set switch derails a train. The passenger car rolls  down the mountain, killing 8 people and injuring 70 more.
 November 5 – United Kingdom – Hither Green rail crash, a broken rail causes a derailment resulting in 49 deaths.
 December 15 – Canada – Two Canadian National Railways locomotives on a siding at Boston Bar, British Columbia, are apparently deliberately started and left to run away unmanned on the main line.  They travel  before colliding with a 95-car freight train in a  tunnel, killing one railwayman and injuring others.

1968 
 January 6 – United Kingdom – Hixon rail crash, England: A Manchester-London express strikes a vehicle carrying a 122-tonne (120-long ton) transformer at an automatic level crossing. Eleven people are killed and 27 seriously injured.
 January 27 – Brazil – At General Câmara, an accident with a train heading for Porto Alegre kills 52 people, or kills 41 people and injures 57.
 February 27 – Canada – When a Canadian National Railways train strikes a rockslide near Boston Bar in Fraser Canyon, a locomotive falls  into the river and two crew members are killed.
 March 15 – Spain – On a downgrade near Las Navas del Marqués, a work train runs away, is unable to stop for signals at Santa María de la Alameda, and runs onto the section from there to Robledo de Chavela, where only one track is in use. Altogether 28 people are killed and about 80 injured, 50 seriously. 
 March 16 – Canada – At Pefferlaw, Ontario, head-on collision between a northbound and a southbound train. One train had not completed its pull into a siding when the other train struck, either misreading the lights or the lighting signals indicating a clear track ahead. James Henry Johnson (brakeman) and 2 others dead, 4 injured. Both trains operated by Canadian National Railways. 
 March 19 – India – At Yalvigi,  the Deccan Express from Poona (now Pune) to Bangalore (now Bengaluru) collides head-on with a local train; at least 40 are killed and 38 injured.
 June 24 – Switzerland – Sion: A freight train collides head-on with a train carrying 300 passengers on an outing. 12 killed, 103 injured, 17 seriously.
September 15 – United States – San Antonio, Texas: At the HemisFair, a monorail train is derailed. One person is killed.
 October 1 – Greece – Two trains carrying people returning to Athens after voting in their home towns in a constitutional referendum collide at Corinth, killing 34 people and injuring 150.
 October 7 – Romania – Bucerdea Grânoasă: A fast passenger train collides head-on with a local train. 22 people killed, 72 injured.
 December 12 – Hungary – Mende: A fast passenger train collides head-on with a freight train. 43 people killed, 60 injured.

1969 
 January 4 – United Kingdom – Marden rail crash, a passenger train runs into the back of a parcels train after passing a signal at danger. Four people killed, eleven injured.
 February 7 - Australia - Violet Town rail accident Victoria, Australia, A Southern Aurora train collided onto an Albury train, 9 people were killed and 117 people were injured.
 May 7 – United Kingdom – A passenger train derails at Morpeth, Northumberland due to excessive speed on a curve. Six people are killed and 21 injured.
 July 30 – Yugoslavia – Between Tetovo and Gostivar (both now in North Macedonia), a 2-car diesel railcar collides head-on with three tank cars running away downhill; 29 people are killed and 17 injured, and staff at Gostivar station are arrested for negligence.
 August 20 – United States – Darien, Connecticut: Two New York, New Haven and Hartford Railroad electric multiple units collide head-on along the single-track New Canaan Branch. Three crew and one passenger die, due to crew's disregard of train orders.
 October 29 – United States – East Rochester, New York: A 30-car Penn Central freight train carrying produce derailed, crushing numerous parked automobiles and toppling telephone poles. No one was injured.
 December 31 – Senegal – A train from Dakar to St-Louis collides near Thiès with a goods train, killing at least 20.

See also 
 List of accidents by death toll, category "other"
 List of road accidents – includes level crossing accidents.
 List of British rail accidents
 List of Russian rail accidents
 Years in rail transport

References

Sources

External links
 Railroad train wrecks 1907–2007

Rail accidents 1960-1969
20th-century railway accidents